The North Branch of the Upper Ammonoosuc River is an  river in northern New Hampshire in the United States. It is a tributary of the Upper Ammonoosuc River and part of the Connecticut River watershed.

Nearly the entire length of the North Branch is in the town of Milan, New Hampshire. The river briefly enters the city of Berlin, where it passes through Head Pond, then heads north back into Milan, running parallel to the Upper Ammonoosuc until the two rivers join in the village of West Milan. The Androscoggin River, just three miles to the east, flows parallel to the two Upper Ammonoosuc branches, but in the opposite direction. The St. Lawrence and Atlantic Railroad follows the North Branch from Head Pond to West Milan.

See also 

 List of New Hampshire rivers

References

Rivers of New Hampshire
Tributaries of the Connecticut River
Rivers of Coös County, New Hampshire